Robert "Bob" Strahan Perew (August 5, 1923 – November 14, 1999) was an American oarsman who was a bronze medalist in the 1948 Summer Olympics.

Early life
Perew was born in Philadelphia, Pennsylvania. His parents were Bernice (née Strahan) and Robert Jackman Perew.

Perew lived in Buffalo, New York, and West Palm Beach, Florida during his youth. He graduated from Lafayette High School in Buffalo in 1941. 

He then attended Yale University. Midway through his college career, he enlisted in the submarine service of the U.S. Navy. He was commissioned a communications officer on the USS Thornback (SS-418), serving in the Pacific during World War II.

After the war, Perew returned to Yale, graduating in 1948 with a degree in mechanical engineering.

Rowing 
Perew began rowing while in high school at Buffalo's West Side Rowing Club. During college he was a member of the Yale Bulldogs' crew team in 1947 and 1948. 

While still in college, he was on the U.S. team at the 1948 Olympics. He was part of the Men's Coxless Fours who took the bronze medal, alongside Gregory Gates, Stuart Griffing, and Frederick Kingsbury. He had the bow seat.

Career 
Perew worked for General Electric and Electric Boat. He was then the sale manager for the northeast area for York International, retiring in 1989.

He also served in the Navy Reserve until 1989, achieving the rank of lieutenant commander.

Personal life 
He lived near Long Island Sound in Waterford, Connecticut for over forty years. He had two daughters, Ann and Joyce.

He was a member of the Yale-Harvard Regatta Committee for many years. He was also a member of the Retired Officers Association, Veterans of Foreign Wars, and the U.S. Olympic Alumni Association. In addition, he was a member of St. James Episcopal Church in New London, Connecticut. 

In 1999, he died in Denton, Texas, where he lived from 1996 to 1999.

References

1923 births
1999 deaths
American male rowers
Yale Bulldogs rowers
Yale University alumni
Rowers at the 1948 Summer Olympics
Olympic bronze medalists for the United States in rowing
Medalists at the 1948 Summer Olympics
Lafayette High School (Buffalo, New York) alumni
United States Navy officers